James Pilkington (1804 – 17 February 1890) was a merchant and cotton manufacturer, and a Liberal Party politician.

He served as the Member of Parliament (MP) for Blackburn 1847–65.

He was Deputy Lieutenant of Lancashire.

References

External links 

1804 births
1890 deaths
Liberal Party (UK) MPs for English constituencies
UK MPs 1847–1852
UK MPs 1852–1857
UK MPs 1857–1859
UK MPs 1859–1865
Deputy Lieutenants of Lancashire
Politics of Blackburn with Darwen